Cassatt is an unincorporated community in Kershaw County, South Carolina, United States. Its ZIP code is 29032. The community is located 13 miles north of Camden, on US Route 1.

Notable person
South Carolina state legislator Dick Elliott was born in Cassatt.

Notes

Unincorporated communities in Kershaw County, South Carolina
Unincorporated communities in South Carolina